Alessandra Ramos Makkeda was a Brazilian human rights defender and a prominent activist on LGBTI issues.

Alessandra was born in 1981 in Brasilia and lives in Rio de Janeiro. She is a trans woman and an LGBTI activist, and works as a translator and interpreter in several languages, including sign language. Alessandra is a member of Transrevolução, a Rio-based group that fights discrimination and promotes discussions of lesbian, gay and transgender issues. As one of the co-ordinators of the National Forum for Afro-Brazilian transgender people, she helped she helped organize the first National Black Trans Forum in Porto Alegre in 2015. Alessandra died on May 15, 2022, in her native Brazil, after a sudden illness.

References

Living people
Brazilian human rights activists
Transgender women
Brazilian LGBT rights activists
Year of birth missing (living people)
Women civil rights activists
21st-century LGBT people